Spike is a nickname of the following people:

Arts and entertainment
 Spike Feresten (born 1964), television writer and talk show host
 Spike Jones (1911–1965), American musician and bandleader
 Spike Jonze (born 1969), American filmmaker and photographer
 Spike Lee (born 1957), American filmmaker
 Spike Milligan (1918–2002), Irish satirist, creator of The Goon Show
 Spike Robinson (1930–2001), jazz musician
 Spike Spencer (born 1968), American voice actor
 Spike Stent (born 1965), English record producer and mixing engineer
 Spike Trotman, American cartoonist and publisher

Sports
 Spike Albrecht (born 1992), American college basketball player
 Spike Gehlhausen (born 1954), American race car driver
 Spike Jones (American football) (born 1947), American former National Football League punter
 Spike McRoy (born 1968), American golfer
 Spike Pola (1914–2012), Australian rules footballer

Military
 William H. P. Blandy (1890–1954), US Navy admiral
 William Eckert (1909–1971), US Air Force lieutenant general and fourth Commissioner of Major League Baseball
 William W. Momyer (1916–2012), US Air Force general and World War II flying ace

Politics
 Spike Cohen (born 1982), American libertarian vice presidential candidate, political activist, entrepreneur, and podcaster

Fictional Characters
 Spike The Bulldog, a character from Tom and Jerry
 Spike The Dragon, a character from My Little Pony: Friendship is Magic
 Spike Spiegel Bounty hunter protagonist of the 1998 anime series Cowboy Bebop
 Spike Pratt Vampire in the television series Buffy the Vampire Slayer and Angel

Lists of people by nickname